Shrivenham railway station was a station on the Great Western Main Line serving the village of Shrivenham in what was then part of Berkshire.

History

The main station building was built in 1840. It was very small, faced with flint, had Tudor style windows and a roof that projected in the form of a canopy.

On 10 May 1848 six passengers were killed and 13 injured at Shrivenham when two porters pushed a horse-box and cattle van onto the main line to free a waggon turntable. The Exeter express struck them; the locomotive was undamaged but the side of the leading coach was torn out killing six passengers and injuring 13 more.

On 15 January 1936 an express from Penzance collided with some coal wagons just outside the station that had become detached from an earlier train. Two people (the male driver and a female passenger) were killed and 10 injured.

On 7 December 1964 British Railways withdrew passenger services from Shrivenham and all other intermediate stations between Didcot and Swindon. The station buildings were demolished in 1965 but remnants of the platforms survive.

Routes

References

Disused railway stations in Oxfordshire
Great Western Main Line
Former Great Western Railway stations
Railway stations in Great Britain opened in 1840
Railway stations in Great Britain closed in 1964
Beeching closures in England